Vacarme may refer to:

Vacarme (2011 film), a Canadian short film directed by Daniel Karolewicz,
Vacarme (2020 film), a Canadian drama film directed by Neegan Trudel,
Vacarme (magazine), a French political and cultural magazine,
Vacarme (horse), a race horse.